Alberto Cirio (born 6 December 1972) is an Italian politician and Member of the European Parliament (MEP) from Italy from 2014 to 2019. He is a member of the centre-right Forza Italia.

Biography
He studied law at the University of Turin.

Cirio served as Deputy Mayor of Alba from 1995 to 2005. In 2005 he was elected Regional Councilor of Piedmont. In 2010 Cirio was re-elected to the Regional Council. Regional Minister for Education, Tourism and Sport in the Piedmont Region from 2010 to 2014.

In the 2014 European election he was elected to the European Parliament for the North-West region.

On 26 May 2019 he was elected President of Piedmont, supported by Forza Italia, the Northern League, Brothers of Italy and Union of the Centre.

On 8 March 2020, he tested positive for COVID-19.

References

External links

1972 births
Living people
Politicians from Turin
University of Turin alumni
Members of the Regional Council of Piedmont
Presidents of Piedmont
Lega Nord politicians
The People of Freedom politicians
Forza Italia (2013) politicians
Forza Italia MEPs
MEPs for Italy 2014–2019
21st-century Italian politicians